László Cseh  (4 April 1910 – 8 January 1950) was a Hungarian football forward who played for Hungary in the 1938 FIFA World Cup. He also played for MTK Hungária FC.

References

External links

Hungarian footballers
Hungary international footballers
1938 FIFA World Cup players
1910 births
1950 deaths
Association football forwards